A list of notable Polish politicians of the Polish People's Party.

A
 Tomasz Adamczuk
 Jan Adamiak
 Kazimierz Adamski
 Norbert Aleksiewicz
 Jan Andrykiewicz

B
 Tadeusz Balcerowski
 Roman Bartoszcze
 Edmund Borawski
 Wojciech Borzuchowski

C
 Józef Cepil

D
 Kazimierz Dejmek
 Leszek Deptuła
 Zbigniew Deptuła
 Janusz Dobrosz
 Bronisław Dutka
 Maria Dziuba

G
 Ludomir Goździkiewicz
 Józef Gruszka
 Eugeniusz Grzeszczak
 Andrzej Grzyb
 Michał Górski

H
 Danuta Hojarska

J
 Romuald Jankowski
 Mieczysław Janowski
 Adam Jarubas
 Antoni Jaszczak

K
 Stanisław Kalemba
 Jarosław Kalinowski
 Franciszek Kamiński
 Ewa Kierzkowska
 Zbigniew Komorowski
 Mikołaj Kozakiewicz
 Janusz Kołodziej
 Mirosław Krajewski
 Rafał Kubacki
 Maria Kurnatowska
 Zbigniew Kuźmiuk
 Eugeniusz Kłopotek

M
 Jan Majewski
 Janusz Maksymiuk
 Mirosław Maliszewski
 Wojciech Mojzesowicz
 Leszek Murzyn

N
 Waldemar Nowakowski

O
 Maria Olszewska
 Jerzy Osiński
 Krystyna Ozga

P
 Mirosław Pawlak
 Waldemar Pawlak
 Andrzej Pałys
 Janusz Piechociński
 Zdzisław Podkański
 Bogdan Pęk

R
 Krzysztof Rutkowski
 Stanisław Rydzoń
 Erwina Ryś-Ferens

S
 Marek Sawicki
 Czesław Siekierski
 Wojciech Siemion
 Ryszard Smolarek
 Henryk Smolarz
 Aleksander Sopliński
 Zbigniew Sosnowski
 Ryszard Stanibuła
 Franciszek Stefaniuk
 Adam Struzik
 Tadeusz Sławecki

W
 Ewa Więckowska
 Wiesław Woda
 Janusz Wojciechowski
 Edward Wojtas
 Zbigniew Włodkowski

Z
 Józef Zych

Ł
 Jan Łopata

Ż
 Stanisław Żelichowski
  

 
People's Party